In baseball, an assist (denoted by A) is a defensive statistic, baseball being one of the few sports in which the defensive team controls the ball. An assist is credited to every defensive player who fields or touches the ball (after it has been hit by the batter) prior to the recording of a putout, even if the contact was unintentional. For example, if a ball strikes a player's leg and bounces off him to another fielder, who tags the baserunner, the first player is credited with an assist. A fielder can receive a maximum of one assist per out recorded. An assist is also credited if a putout would have occurred, had another fielder not committed an error. For example, a shortstop might field a ground ball cleanly, but the first baseman might drop his throw. In this case, an error would be charged to the first baseman, and the shortstop would be credited with an assist. The catcher is a position for a baseball or softball player. When a batter takes his/her turn to hit, the catcher crouches behind home plate, in front of the (home) umpire, and receives the ball from the pitcher. In addition to these primary duties, the catcher is also called upon to master many other skills in order to field the position well. The role of the catcher is similar to that of the wicket-keeper in cricket. In the numbering system used to record defensive plays, the catcher is assigned the number 2.

Catchers are most frequently credited with an assist when they throw out a runner attempting a stolen base, but other situations leading to an assist include bunts where the catcher fields the batted ball near home plate and throws out the batter at first base (or another runner), an uncaught third strike after which the catcher throws out the batter trying to reach first base, rundown plays in which a runner is stranded between bases, and throwing out runners who fail to tag up after a fly ball out. As the frequency of strikeouts has risen in baseball, the number of other fielding outs has declined; the rise of power hitting has also led to a decline in more daring baserunning. Consequently, the list of career assist leaders is dominated by catchers from the dead-ball era prior to 1920, when runners made more aggressive attempts to advance around the bases in risky situations; none of the top 20 players were active after 1931, and only three players since 1950 have reached even 60% of the record. None of the top 65 single-season totals were recorded after 1920, and none of the top 340 were recorded after 1928; only 13 seasons of 100 assists have been recorded since 1945, peaking at 108, far short of the record of 238. As a result, both the career and single-season records are likely among Major League Baseball's most unbreakable records.

Deacon McGuire is the all-time leader with 1,860 career assists. Only 48 catchers have recorded 1,000 or more career assists, with Yadier Molina being the only one active.

Key

List

Stats updated through the 2022 season.

Other Hall of Famers

Notes

References

External links

Major League Baseball statistics
Assists as a catcher